Pigs Is Pigs is a 1910 silent film short written by Ellis Parker Butler and starring Charles M. Seay and Miriam Nesbitt. It was produced by the Edison Manufacturing Company.

Cast
Charles M. Seay
Miriam Nesbitt
Augustus Phillips
Jessie Stevens

References

External links
 Pigs Is Pigs at IMDb.com

1910 films
American silent short films
1910 short films
Edison Manufacturing Company films
Films based on short fiction
1910s American films
1910s English-language films